Philip F. Gura (born June 14, 1950) is an intellectual and cultural historian.  He currently serves as William S. Newman Distinguished Professor of American Literature and Culture at the University of North Carolina at Chapel Hill, where he holds appointments in the Departments of English and Comparative Literature, Religious Studies, and American Studies.

Biography
Gura was born in Ware, Massachusetts.  A graduate of Phillips Academy (1968), he received his AB, magna cum laude, in History and Literature in 1972 from Harvard College, and his PhD, in the History of American Civilization in 1977, from Harvard University, where he lived in Lowell House.

He is the author or editor of 14 books, including The Wisdom of Words: Language, Theology, and Literature in the New England Renaissance (1981), A Glimpse of Sion's Glory: Puritan Radicalism in New England, 1620–1660 (1984), the prize-winning America's Instrument: The Banjo in the 19th Century (1999), Buried from the World: Inside the Massachusetts State Prison, 1829–1831 (2001), C. F. Martin and His Guitars, 1796–1873 (2003), Jonathan Edwards: America’s Evangelical (2005), American Transcendentalism: A History (2007), which was a National Book Critics Circle Award finalist in non-fiction, The American Antiquarian Society, 1812–2012: A Bicentennial History (2012), Truth's Ragged Edge: The Rise of the American Novel (2013), Jonathan Edwards: Writings from the Great Awakening (2013), The Life of William Apess (Pequot) (2015), and Man’s Better Angels: Romantic Reformers and the Coming of the Civil War (2017). Some of his essays, which number over fifty, have been collected in The Crossroads of American History and Literature (1996). He has served as an editor of The Norton Anthology of American Literature.

Gura is an elected member of the American Antiquarian Society, the Massachusetts Historical Society, the Colonial Society of Massachusetts, and the Society of American Historians. In 2008, the Division on American Literature to 1800 of the Modern Language Association honored him with its Distinguished Scholar award. In 2019 the governor of North Carolina named him to the Order of the Long Leaf Pine, a state-wide honor.

He plays the clawhammer banjo in a traditional Appalachian style, known as "old-time."

Selected work

 Man’s Better Angels: Romantic Reformers and the Coming of the Civil War (2017)
 The Life of William Apess (Pequot) (2015)
 Jonathan Edwards: Writings from the Great Awakening (2013).
 Truth's Ragged Edge: The Rise of the American Novel (2013).
 The American Antiquarian Society, 1812–2012: A Bicentennial History (2012).
 American Transcendentalism: A History (2007).
 Jonathan Edwards: America's Evangelical (2005).
 C.F. Martin and His Guitars, 1796–1873 (2003).
 Buried from the World: Inside the Massachusetts State Prison, 1829–1831, The Memorandum Books of the Rev. Jared Curtis (2001).
 America's Instrument: The Banjo in the Nineteenth Century (1999).
 The Crossroads of American History and Literature (1996).
 Memoirs of Stephen Burroughs (1988).
 A Glimpse of Sion's Glory: Puritan Radicalism in New England, 1620–1660 (1984).
 Critical Essays on American Transcendentalism (1982).
 The Wisdom of Words: Language, Theology, and Literature in the New England Renaissance (1981).

Notes

Living people
American literary critics
University of North Carolina at Chapel Hill faculty
University of Colorado faculty
1950 births
Harvard College alumni
Phillips Academy alumni
Members of the American Antiquarian Society
People from Ware, Massachusetts